Franza is an Italian surname. Notable people with the surname include:

 Enea Franza (1907–1986), Italian politician
 Luigi Franza (1939–2020), Italian politician, son of Enea

Italian-language surnames